Richard Pugoy Gonzales (born March 31, 1971) is a Filipino table tennis player and the No. 1 ranked player in the Philippines as of January 2014.

Career 
Gonzales is a multiple medalist at the Southeast Asian Games in Table Tennis, winning Silver both at the 2005 and the recently concluded 2015 edition, and bronze at the 2009 and 2013 editions all in Men's Singles Event. He won bronze along with Rodel Valle at the men's double event of the 2011 edition.  Along with John Russel Misal, Gonzales clinched a silver at the men's double of the 2021 edition.

Aside from the Southeast Asian Games, he also reigned at the 2005 Southeast Asian Table Tennis Championship winning Gold.

Outside Southeast Asia, Gonzales has represented the Philippines at the 2014 World Championship of Ping Pong winning bronze after bowing out to Maxim Shmyrev in the semifinal. Gonzales along with Ian Lariba were the Philippines' representatives at the 2014 World Team Table Tennis Championships.

References

1971 births
Living people
Filipino table tennis players
Table tennis players at the 2006 Asian Games
Southeast Asian Games medalists in table tennis
Southeast Asian Games silver medalists for the Philippines
Southeast Asian Games bronze medalists for the Philippines
Competitors at the 2005 Southeast Asian Games
Competitors at the 2009 Southeast Asian Games
Competitors at the 2011 Southeast Asian Games
Competitors at the 2013 Southeast Asian Games
Competitors at the 2015 Southeast Asian Games
Asian Games competitors for the Philippines
Competitors at the 1999 Southeast Asian Games
Competitors at the 2017 Southeast Asian Games
Competitors at the 2019 Southeast Asian Games
Competitors at the 2021 Southeast Asian Games